That Awful Mess on Via Merulana is an Italian novel by Carlo Emilio Gadda, first published in Italy by Garzanti Editore s.p.a. in 1957. An English translation by William Weaver was published in 1965.

Plot summary
In fascist Italy in 1927, Detective Francesco Ingravallo, known to friends as Don Ciccio, is called in to investigate the murder of Liliana Balducci, a well-to-do woman who happens to be a close friend. As Don Ciccio and his colleagues dig deeper into the grisly murder, the mechanics of the detective novel take a backseat to the wordplay and experimentation with which Gadda presents a panorama of life in early fascist Rome.

Reception
That Awful Mess on Via Merulana was well received in Italian literary circles.

References

20th-century Italian novels
Italian crime novels
1957 novels
Fiction set in 1927
Novels set in Rome